The  , branded as the , is a hybrid light rail/tram line in Tokyo, Japan, operated by the Tokyo Metropolitan Bureau of Transportation (Toei). The Arakawa Line is the sole survivor of Tokyo's once-extensive Tokyo Toden streetcar system. It is one of the only two tram lines in Tokyo, besides the Tokyu Setagaya Line.

Station list 

All stations are located in Tokyo.

Rolling stock
 7700 series (since 31 May 2016)
 8500 series
 8800 series
 8900 series (since 18 September 2015)
 9000 series

Former rolling stock
 7000 series (1955 until 10 June 2017)
 7500 series

History 

The line was at threat of being shut down along with the rest of Tokyo's streetcar system in the 1960s, but concerted opposition from residents prevented this and parts of lines 27 (Minowabashi-Akabane) and 32 (Arakawa-Waseda) were merged to form the line as it is today. The line was sold to the Tokyo Metropolitan Bureau of Transportation in 1974, which renamed it the Toden Arakawa Line.

The Toden Arakawa Line operates between the terminals at Minowabashi Station and Waseda Station. It runs along Meiji Street between Asuka-yama Station and Oji Eki-mae Station. Otherwise, it operates on its own tracks. Presently, single driver-operated cars make the 12.2 km trip in 50 minutes. The line is fully double-track, and draws 600 V electrical supply.

Two Toden Arakawa trams (one in revenue earning service, the other undergoing brake testing) collided on June 13, 2006 near the Minowabashi terminus, injuring 27 people.

Sights

The Toden Arakawa Line operates in northern and eastern Tokyo outside the main tourist areas. The terminus at Minowabashi is near the historical site of Edo's red-light district Yoshiwara which features a completely covered shopping street, several blocks long, in the once common "Ameyoko" style (a shōtengai).

In literature
In Haruki Murakami's novel Norwegian Wood, protagonist Toru Watanabe takes the line to near Ōtsuka Station: "I sat in the last seat and watched the ancient houses passing close to the window. The tram almost touched the overhanging eaves.... The tram snaked its way through this private back-alley world."

References 

L.W. Demery, R. Forty, R. DeGroote and J.W. Higgins, Electric Railways of Japan (Interurbans- Tramways-Metros) Vol.1: Tokyo and Northern Japan. Light Rail Transit Association, 1983.

External links 

 Tokyo Metropolitan Bureau of Transportation: Toden Arakawa Line 
 Toei Streetcar (Toden) Arakawa Line 
 Nippori-Toneri Liner and Tokyo Sakura Tram station numbering 

 
Railway lines in Japan
Tram transport in Japan
Lines of Tokyo Metropolitan Bureau of Transportation
Railway lines in Tokyo
4 ft 6 in gauge railways in Japan
Railway lines opened in 1974
1974 establishments in Japan
600 V DC railway electrification